The women's light heavyweight (65 kg/143 lbs) Full-Contact category at the W.A.K.O. European Championships 2004 in Budva was the fourth heaviest of the female Full-Contact tournaments and involved just four fighters.  Each of the matches was three rounds of two minutes each and were fought under Full-Contact kickboxing rules.

The tournament champion was Russia's Maria Karlova who added to the gold she had won in Paris the previous year by defeating host nation Serbia and Montenegro's Marija Ristovic in the final by unanimous decision.  Defeated semi finalists Katalin Csehi from Hungary and Anne Katas from Finland gained bronze medals.

Results

Key

See also
List of WAKO Amateur European Championships
List of WAKO Amateur World Championships
List of female kickboxers

References

External links
 WAKO World Association of Kickboxing Organizations Official Site

W.A.K.O. European Championships 2004 (Budva)